Haddon W. Robinson (21 March 1931  22 July 2017) was the Harold John Ockenga Distinguished Professor of Preaching, senior director of the Doctor of Ministry program, and former interim President at Gordon-Conwell Theological Seminary. He was also the founding President of the Theology of Work Project.

Biography
A native of New York City, he received a bachelor's degree from Bob Jones University, a Th.M. from Dallas Theological Seminary, a M.A. from Southern Methodist University, and a Ph.D. from the University of Illinois. Dr. Robinson also served as president of Denver Conservative Baptist Seminary (now known as Denver Seminary) for 12 years (1979–1991), and taught homiletics on the faculty of Dallas Theological Seminary for 19 years. He has authored seven books, including Biblical Preaching. "Biblical Preaching" is a primary source for the study of expository preaching.  He has written and edited for several magazines.

Robinson was, in recent years, widely heard as the 'lead teacher' on the 15-minute Discover The Word radio program (formerly Radio Bible Class) produced by Grand Rapids, Michigan-based RBC Ministries.

Robinson had a longstanding commitment to helping people connect the Bible to their work in every sector of society. Ultimately this interest took the form of co-founding the Theology of Work Project and serving as the Project's president from its inception in 2007 until his death in 2017.

Dr. Robinson lived with his wife, Bonnie, in South Hamilton, Massachusetts, and Willow Street, Pennsylvania. they had two children, Torrey ( a preacher) and Vicky. Haddon Robinson died from Parkinson's Disease. 

One of his major contributions to homiletics was the "Big Idea of Biblical Preaching" (the title of a book which is in his honor), whereby sermons should have one major idea (has one subject and one complement), even if the big idea breaks down into several subpoints. Robinson also argues that a sermon should be primarily expository, since that places the authority in the biblical text, not in the preachers themselves. He was instrumental in changing the name of Denver Conservative Baptist Seminary to Denver Seminary.

Works

Books

 - combined edition of Christian Salt and Light Company & Solid Rock Construction Company

References

1931 births
2017 deaths
American evangelicals
Gordon–Conwell Theological Seminary faculty
Writers from New York City
Seminary presidents
Southern Methodist University alumni
University of Illinois alumni